Rabbi Seymour Rossel (born August 9, 1945) is an American author, publisher, editor, educator, and founder of Rossel Books. Through his work in editing, writing, and publishing, he has influenced Jewish education and culture throughout the English-speaking world.

Personal life
Rossel was born on August 9, 1945 in Chicago, Illinois to renowned chef Willy Otto and Leona (Wadler). The family moved to Dallas, Texas in 1956. While a senior in high school, Rossel was selected to edit Whangdoodle, the citywide book review publication of the Young Adult department of the Dallas Public Library, where his writing was encouraged and tutored by famous children’s librarian and author, Siddie Joe Johnson.

He received a B.A. in History with a Minor in Education from Southern Methodist University in Dallas, TX in 1968. He became editor of the SMU literary journal, Espejo, in which his award-winning short stories had previously appeared. Under the tutelage of Texas author Marshall Terry, he entered the Book of the Month Club Writing Fellowship Awards, becoming a Southwest Regional Finalist for his story "The Demonstration" which was published in a Doubleday anthology of young authors entitled Growing Up in America.

He received his M.A. in 1978 from New York University School of Education, Institute of Hebrew Culture, where he studied Bible and archaeology with Dr. Cyrus Gordon. His post-graduate work included studies in education under Dr. Henry J. Perkinson and studies in mythology and world religions under Dr. Joseph Campbell.

He became a Fellow in Religious Education (F.R.E), NATE in 1982, and a Reform Jewish Educator (R.J.E.), URJ (UAHC) & HUC-JIR in 1988.

Rossel was ordained as a Rabbi in 2000 in New York, by the Westchester Beit Din, sponsored by Rabbis Chaim Stern, Manuel Gold, and Shoshana Hantman.

Rossel married Jewish educator Sharon L. Wechter in 1999. Of his four children, two (Rabbi Amy Rossel and Rabbi Rachel Maimin) have been ordained by the HUC-JIR and are serving congregations in the Reform movement. His daughter Deborah Rossel Bradford was a Student Laureate Poet for the State of Connecticut and is currently Head of the Department of Academic Strategies at Tunxis Community College. His son Benjamin Maimin is Chief Operating Officer of Opus 3 Artists.

Professional
Rossel is publisher of Rossel Books and CEO of Rossel Counseling and Consulting, Inc. For many years, he lectured on Bible and Jewish subjects at the Women's Institute of Houston,. He continues to conduct workshops in Bible, Jewish history, and Jewish mysticism (Kabbalah); and to serve as scholar-in-residence and storyteller-in-residence for Jewish federations and synagogues throughout North America.

Publishing career
Rossel's work as a Jewish publisher began when he was hired to serve as Executive Editor (later, Executive Vice-President) of Behrman House, Inc., in 1972. His editorial work, guided by Jacob Behrman and Eugene B. Borowitz, resulted in the textbooks and guides for teachers that formed the backbone of present Jewish curriculum in the Reform, Conservative, and Reconstructionist movements throughout the English-speaking world.

His aspiration to bring modern scholarship into the classrooms of Jewish religious schools led to publications of student versions of Amos Elon's Israelis: Founders and Sons; Lucy Dawidowicz’s The War Against the Jews, Abba Eban's, My People, and a series of books on Talmud and Midrash written by Jacob Neusner and edited by Dr. David Altshuler.

To serve the needs of high school and adult studies in the Jewish community, he founded The Jewish Concepts and Issues series, commissioning and publishing Judaism and the New Woman by the first female rabbi, Sally Priesand, The Russian Jewry Reader by Evan Chesler, and Anti-Semitism in Europe: Sources of the Holocaust edited by David Zisenwine.

For adult studies, he issued a series of original and reprint editions of Louis Jacobs' A Jewish Theology, Meyer Levin's Eva: A Novel of the Holocaust, Jiří Langer's Nine Gates to the Chassidic Mysteries, and Rachmil Bryk’s Kiddush HaShem (A Cat in the Ghetto).

Leaving Behrman House in 1981, he founded Rossel Books, Inc. In a time when few of the major trade publishers were willing to invest in works directed to the needs of the American Jewish community, Rossel published a series of influential books including the first book on the Holocaust specifically directed to young children, Promise of a New Spring by Holocaust survivor and author Gerda Weissman Klein; the Simon Wiesenthal Center's Genocide, critical issues of the Holocaust: A companion to the film, Genocide; Tzedakah by Jacob Neusner; The Bar Kokhba Syndrome: Risk and Realism in International Relations by Yehoshafat Harkabi; Contemporary Jewish Education: Issachar American Style by Alvin Schiff; Creative Jewish Education: A Reconstructionist Perspective, edited by Jacob Staub; and Gates of Freedom: A Passover Haggadah by Chaim Stern.

Rossel has resumed publishing through Rossel Books, notably producing Paths of Faith: The New Jewish Prayer Book for Synagogue and Home : For Weekdays, Shabbat, Festivals & Other Occasions by Chaim Stern; The New Family Prayerbook by Sheldon Zimmerman; Reinventing Adult Jewish Education by Betsy Dolgin Katz; The Unity Principle: The Shaping of Jewish History by Ellis Rivkin; and Bible Dreams: The Spiritual Quest: How the Dreams in the Bible Speak to Us Today (Revised 2nd Edition) by Rossel himself.

From 1993 to 1997, Rossel served as Publisher for the American Reform movement (URJ, formerly UAHC), where he directed the press to a round of new publishing that including several important contributions in Jewish education and Jewish interfaith work, notably A Congregation of Learners: Transforming the Synagogue into a Learning Community (edited by Sara Lee, Seymour Rossel, and Isa Aron), What Crucified Jesus?: Messianism, Pharisaism, and the Development of Christianity by Ellis Rivkin, and The Haftarah Commentary by W. Gunther Plaut and Chaim Stern.

Career in Jewish education
Rossel served as Lecturer in Education at Hebrew Union College-Jewish Institute of Religion from 1973 to 1985 when he became Dean of the School of Education of HUC-JIR, New York campus. He served as Curriculum Expert for the United States Holocaust Memorial Museum (1984-1985) and as National Director of Gesher LeKesher, a program for teenage Jewish education, from 1988-1989. After his temporary relocation to Texas, he was Headmaster of the Solomon Schechter Academy of Dallas, Texas (1991-1992) before being called back to New York to serve as Director of the National Department of Education of the Reform movement (URJ) and Director of the combined Commission on Reform Jewish Education of the CCAR, URJ, and NATE (1993-1996).

Devoted to Jewish teacher education, Rossel was a co-founder of the Coalition for the Advancement of Jewish Education (CAJE), serving for many years on its executive board and once as its Vice Chairperson. He was the Chairperson of its two international conferences, CAJE 13 (1988) and CAJE 21 (1996), both convened at the Hebrew University of Jerusalem. In 1976, he sponsored the appearance of legendary folk-singer and composer Debbie Friedman at the CAJE conference at Rutgers University which first brought her to the attention of the national Jewish community.

He was called to serve as Rabbi of Congregation Jewish Community North of Spring, Texas from 2005-2010.

Seymour lectures widely on Israel, the Holocaust, Bible, archaeology, spirituality, Jewish history and Jewish education. He is known for many appearances as scholar-in-residence; teacher, board, and congregational workshop leader; and guest lecturer for Bureaus and Federations in communities throughout North America.

Books
Rossel is the author of 36 books including The Wise Folk of Chelm; A Child’s Bible (2 volumes); The Essential Jewish Stories: God, Torah, Israel and Faith; The Torah: Portion-by-Portion; Managing the Jewish Classroom: How to Transform Yourself Into a Master Teacher; Let Freedom Ring: The Jews of America; A Thousand and One Chickens; When a Jew Prays, and When a Jew Seeks Wisdom: The Sayings of the Fathers.

He has edited more than 300 books, working with many distinguished Jewish authors. For nearly twenty years, he served on the Executive Board of the Jewish Book Council of America.

Awards
Rossel holds the Israel Bonds’ Bonei HaNegev award for excellence in Jewish Education and was honored as an ex officio member of the Central Conference of American Rabbis.

References

External links
Official site

American publishers (people)
American rabbis
Jewish American writers
Living people
Writers from Chicago
1945 births
21st-century American Jews